Sveinn Ólafur Gunnarsson is an Icelandic stage and film actor who starred in and co-wrote 2011's Either Way, Ragnar Bragason's Metalhead and Baltasar Kormákur's The Deep.

Career
Gunnarsson stars in the film Rams which premiered in the Un Certain Regard section at the 2015 Cannes Film Festival. He also stars in the American film Autumn Lights.

He has also starred in television: he played Valdi in the Icelandic crime mini-series Stella Blómkvist, and appeared in the second episode of the first season of the American IFC satirical series Documentary Now!

Selected filmography
 Heartstone (2016)
 Autumn Lights (2016)
 Rams (2015)
 Blóðberg (2015)
 Life in a Fishbowl (2014)
 Grave & Bones (2014)
 Metalhead (2013)
 Prince Avalanche (2013) (writer)
 The Deep (2013)
 Either Way (2011)
 Heimsendir (2011 TV Mini-series)
 Jar City (2006)
 Stella Blómkvist (2018)
 Let Me Fall (2018)

References

External links
 

Icelandic male stage actors
Icelandic male film actors
Living people
21st-century Icelandic male actors
1976 births